The Atlantic pigtoe (Fusconaia masoni) is a species of bivalve in the family Unionidae. It is endemic to the United States.

References

Molluscs of the United States
Fusconaia
Bivalves described in 1834
Taxa named by Timothy Abbott Conrad
Taxonomy articles created by Polbot